Nazir Ahmad Laway (born 5 November 1963 in Hanad Chawalgam, Kulgam district in Jammu and Kashmir union territory, India) is an Indian politician.He lost his election by only few votes to Yusuf Tairgami(CPI).After that he was elected Member of parliament.His term of Member of Parliament, Rajya Sabha representing the state of Jammu & Kashmir in Rajya Sabha ended on 15 February 2021. On 1 November, he was expelled through an anonymous press release from J&KPDP for anti-party activities as he attended the swearing-in ceremony of first Lt. Governor of Jammu and Kashmir, Girish Chandra Murmu. He strongly opposed the move of Central Government in Parliament when Article 370 & 35 A were abrogated on 5 November 2019. He joined Jammu and Kashmir People's Conference party after being expelled from Jammu and Kashmir Peoples Democratic Party

In December 2022, he was appointed as vice president of J&K peoples conference.

References

1963 births
Living people
People from Kulgam district
Rajya Sabha members from Jammu and Kashmir
Jammu and Kashmir Peoples Democratic Party politicians